Caguanes National Park is a national park in Cuba. It is located in the Yaguajay municipality in the northern part of Sancti Spíritus Province, on the northern (atlantic) coast of Cuba.

It is established around the Caguanes peninsula and includes 10 small cays (Cayos de Piedra) that reach out in the Bay of Buena Vista (a Ramsar Convention site), as well as the Guayaberas swamps and mangroves.

Conservation
The coastal landscape is characterized by caves, arches and niches that open to the sea. A total of 79 caves were numbered in the area.

The ecosystem consists of more than 200 species, 24 of them endemic. 112 species of birds nest in the marsh and coastal area. A large population of mariposa bats is present in the Tres Dolinas cave. A decline in migratory aquatic birds (spoonbills, flamingos, pelicans) nesting in the marshes was registered here. The closure of three sugar mills reduced the pollution in swamps and bay, and numbers were increasing as of 2007.

35 archeology sites are also conserved here, most of them representing cave dwellers. Cave murals can be found in the partially submerged cave system.

References

Geography of Sancti Spíritus Province
National parks of Cuba
Tourist attractions in Sancti Spíritus Province